The Global Recording Artist of the Year is an award presented by the International Federation of the Phonographic Industry (IFPI) to honor the year's commercially best-performing musician, based on global album-equivalent units earned, which includes music downloads, streaming and physical sales. It has been awarded every year since January 2014, starting with the British boy band One Direction, who won the accolade for 2013. American singer-songwriter Taylor Swift is the biggest winner of the accolade, having won three times—in 2014, 2019, and 2022.

Winners 

The IFPI Global Recording Artist of the Year has been awarded every year since January 2014, with British boy band One Direction becoming the first act to receive the accolade for 2013. This success was attributed to the band's third studio album, Midnight Memories, which became the best-selling album of the year. Taylor Swift was awarded the Global Recording Artist of 2014 following her fifth studio album, 1989. It spawned two international number-one singles, "Shake It Off" and "Blank Space".

Adele received the award for the Global Recording Artist of 2015 with the release of her third studio album, 25. It was the best-selling album of the year, with its lead single, "Hello", reaching number one in nearly every country in which it charted. The Global Recording Artist of 2016 went to Drake, whose fourth studio album, Views, was the third best-selling album of the year. The album's second single, "One Dance", became the biggest digital song of the year.

Ed Sheeran received the award for 2017 with the release of his third studio album ÷, which included the singles "Shape of You", "Castle on the Hill", "Galway Girl", and "Perfect". He became the first recipient to have both the best-selling album and single of the year. Drake won the award again in 2018, which made him the first artist to win twice.

Swift matched Drake's achievement when she received the award again for 2019. Her seventh studio album, Lover, was the second best-selling album of 2019. The award for 2020 went to BTS. The band's fourth and fifth studio albums, Map of the Soul: 7 and Be, were the top two best-selling albums of the year. BTS became the first Asian act to win the award. The band repeated the feat for 2021, becoming the third artist—after Drake and Swift—to win the award twice, and the first to do so in consecutive years. Swift became the first artist to win thrice when she was awarded the Global Recording Artist of 2022, following the success of her tenth studio album Midnights.

Annual top-10 artists

2013

2014

2015

2016

2017

2018

2019

2020

2021

2022

See also 

List of best-selling albums of the 21st century
 List of best-selling singles
 List of Billboard Year-End number-one singles and albums
 List of best-selling music artists

References

External links 
 International Federation of the Phonographic Industry

Recorded music
Music industry
Popular music
Global culture